Jorge Alarcón (born 8 February 1956) is an Ecuadorian footballer. He played in seven matches for the Ecuador national football team in 1979. He was also part of Ecuador's squad for the 1979 Copa América tournament.

References

External links
 

1956 births
Living people
Ecuadorian footballers
Ecuador international footballers
Association football forwards
People from Manta, Ecuador